Koraput Junction railway station, located in the Indian state of Odisha, serves Koraput town in Koraput district.

History
In 1960, Indian Railway took up three projects: the Kottavalasa–Koraput–Jeypore–Kirandaul line ( Dandakaranya Project ), the Titlagarh–Bolangir–Jharsuguda Project and the Rourkela–Kiriburu Project. All the three projects taken together were popularly known as the DBK Project or the Dandakaranya Bolangir Kiriburu Project.

The Koraput–Rayagada Rail Link Project was completed on 31 December 1998.

Trains

The Visakhapatnam–Kirandul Passenger passes through Koraput. Howrah–Koraput Samaleshwari Express travels via , Sambalpur and Rayagada. The Durg–Jagdalpur Tri-Weekly Express travels via , Rayagada and Koraput.

Passenger movement
Koraput railway station serves around 27,000 passengers every day.

References

External links
 

Railway stations in Koraput district
Railway junction stations in Odisha
Railway stations in Waltair railway division